The Ministry of National Education and Vocational Training, or simply "Ministry of National Education," is a ministry of the Government of Haiti. This ministry is responsible for vocational training and education in Haiti, along with providing assistance to the Prime Minister.

See also
 List of Education Ministers of Haiti

Government ministries of Haiti